Kaser is a village in the town of Ramapo, Rockland County, New York, United States. The village is completely surrounded by the hamlet of Monsey. As of the 2020 United States census, the village population was 5,491.

Kaser is a village with a population consisting almost entirely of Hasidic Jews of the Viznitz denomination. The etymology of the name is derived from the Eastern European pronunciation of Hebrew, as the word "כֶּתֶר" is pronounced "Kay-ser", hence "Kaser", (כֶּתֶר=crown in English). A total of 4% of Kaser's population claims Romanian ancestry, making Kaser the most Romanian census place in the United States.

The village is the most densely populated municipality in New York State according to the 2010 census, being the only incorporated place in the state with a higher population density than New York City; and the 5th most in the United States.

History
Members of Viznitz, a Hasidic denomination, established Kaser in 1990 so they could build denser housing. Herbert Reisman, the supervisor of the town of Ramapo, cooperated in the creation of Kaser because the town leaders also wanted to create more housing.

Geography

According to the United States Census Bureau, the village has a total area of 0.2 square mile (0.4 km2), all land.

Demographics

As of 2010 census, 99.5% of population was white, 

As of the 2000 census, there were 3,314 people, 1647 households, and 1617 families residing in the village. The population density was 19,342.6 people per square mile (7,531.3/km2). There were 678 housing units at an average density of 3,954.9 per square mile (1,539.9/km2). The racial makeup of the village was 98.61% white, .24% African American, .45% Asian, .03% Pacific Islander, and .66% from two or more races. Hispanic or Latino of any race were .54% of the population.

There were 1647 households, out of which 79.1% had children under the age of 18 living with them, 90.9% were married couples living together, 3.7% were female households with no husband present, and 4.5% were non-families. 3.2% of all households were individuals, and 1.9% had someone living alone who was 65 years of age or older. The average household size was 4.89 and the average family size was 5.04.

In the village, the population was spread out, with 53.4% under the age of 18, 18.2% from 18 to 24, 16.8% from 25 to 44, 6.2% from 45 to 64, and 5.4% who were 65 years of age or older. The median age was 16 years. For every 100 females, there were 99.4 males. For every 100 females age 18 and over, there were 93.7 males. The median income for a household in the village was $13,125, and the median income for a family was $13,191. Males had a median income of $20,500 versus $19,792 for females. The per capita income for the village was $5,147. About 65.0% of families and 66.4% of the population were below the poverty threshold, including 68.9% of those under age 18 and 43.4% of those age 65 or over. The village population grew by 43% from 2000 to 2010.

Government
As of 1997, the town of Ramapo provides police.
As of 2022, the village of Kaser provides with garbage pickup services for Kaser residents

Notable people
 Rabbi Mordechai Hager, leader of Viznitz  (1965 - 2018)
 Isaac Hager, Brooklyn real estate developer (born in Kaser)

See also
 New Square, New York − an all-Hasidic village in the same county.
 Kiryas Joel, New York − an all-Hasidic town in a neighboring county.

References

1990 establishments in New York (state)
Hasidic Judaism in New York (state)
Orthodox Jewish communities
Romanian-Jewish culture in New York (state)
Villages in New York (state)
Villages in Rockland County, New York
Vizhnitz (Hasidic dynasty)
Populated places established in 1990
Populated places established by Hasidim
Jewish communities in the United States
Intentional communities in New York (state)